Nestan (Nene) Kvinikadze (born June 5, 1980, Tbilisi), Georgian writer, scriptwriter and journalist. She graduated from the Shota Rustavelie State University of Film and Theatre. Her first book was published at the age of 18. She is an author of numerous movie-scripts and plays. She has published numerous collections of prose fiction and one novel - Ispahan Nightingales. Since 2006 she is the editor-in-chief of monthly bilingual (Georgian/English] free magazine - "Focus". Her articles and essays are regularly being published in Anabechdi magazine. Since March, 2007 she is one of the producers of Rustavi 2. She is one of the organizers of art festivals "Mziuri" and "Train".

Bibliography

 Unanimously | 1999
 Short Story

 Amargi, Saari Publishing | 2001
 Documentary Novel
 Singing Fountains Georgian Book Publishing | 2003
 Nightingales of Isfahan, Arete Publishing | 2004
 Short Story
 Herself, Nestan Kvinikadze Publishing | 2005
 Short Story
 Techno of Jaguars, Nestan Kvinikadze Publishing | 2008
 Techno der Jaguare: Neuve Erzählerinnen aus Georgien, Frankfurter Verlagsanstalt | 2013

External links
 www.anabechdi.ge
http://book.gov.ge/en/author/kvinikadze-nestan-nene/63

1980 births
Writers from Tbilisi
Living people
21st-century writers from Georgia (country)
21st-century women writers from Georgia (country)